YWC may refer to:

 Ying Wa College, a direct subsidized boys' secondary school in Kowloon, Hong Kong
 Youth for Western Civilization, a far-right youth organization in the United States
 Yuet Wah College, a  boys' Catholic secondary school in Macau